Alcuetas is a locality and minor local entity located in the municipality of Villabraz, in León province, Castile and León, Spain. As of 2020, it has a population of 26.

Geography 
Alcuetas is located 45 km south-southeast of León, Spain.

References

Populated places in the Province of León